Liu Huan (born 14 February 1989) is a Chinese professional footballer who last played for Chinese Super League club Beijing Guoan. His twin younger brother Liu Le is also a footballer.

Club career
Liu Huan started his professional football career in 2009 when he was promoted to China League One side Anhui Jiufang. He joined Tianjin Runyulong in January 2011 when Tianjin took over Anhui Jiufang and followed the club move to Shenyang as Shenyang Shenbei in July 2011. On 11 June 2011, he scored his first senior goal by heading the equalizer in the stoppage time in a 3–3 away draw against Yanbian Baekdu Tigers. Liu transferred to China League Two side Dalian Transcendence on 5 March 2015. He made 18 league appearances as Dalian Transcendence finished the runners-up in the 2015 season and promoted to the second tier.

On 4 January 2017, Liu joined Chinese Super League side Chongqing Dangdai Lifan on a free transfer. He established himself within the team immediately and made his debut for Chongqing on 5 March 2017 in a 0–0 home draw against Yanbian Funde. On 24 June 2017, he scored his first goal for the club in a 1–1 draw against Changchun Yatai. He scored his second goal on 13 August 2017 in a 3–2 away defeat against Shanghai SIPG. He appeared in every minute of the 2017 league season, playing in all 30 Super League games and scored two goals for Chongqing Lifan.

On 1 January 2018, Liu transferred to his hometown club Beijing Sinobo Guoan. He made his debut on 4 March 2018 in a 3–0 away defeat to Shandong Luneng Taishan. He would go on to establish himself as a regular within the team and go on to win his first piece of silverware with the 2018 Chinese FA Cup against Shandong Luneng Taishan. He would continue to be a squad player throughout his time at the club and was loaned out to his previous club Chongqing Lifan throughout the 2020 Chinese Super League season before leaving at the end of the 2022 Chinese Super League season when his contracted finished.

Career statistics
.

Honours

Club
Beijing Guoan
Chinese FA Cup: 2018.

References

External links
 

1989 births
Living people
Chinese footballers
Association football defenders
Beijing Guoan F.C. players
Anhui Jiufang players
Dalian Transcendence F.C. players
Chongqing Liangjiang Athletic F.C. players
Chinese Super League players
China League One players
China League Two players
Footballers from Beijing
Twin sportspeople
Chinese twins